Mahinda VI (?–1187) was a king of the Kingdom of Polonnaruwa who came to the throne by killing his predecessor Vijayabahu II. He only reigned for five days, being killed by his successor and Vijayabahu II's sub-king, Nissanka Malla.

During his short reign, he wrote the Madigiriya inscription to show regards to Maharaja Samara of Srivijaya for his deeds to free the Kingdom of Polonnaruwa from the Cholas.

See also
 Mahavamsa
 List of monarchs of Sri Lanka
 History of Sri Lanka
 Madigiriya inscription

References

External links
 Kings & Rulers of Sri Lanka
 Codrington's Short History of Ceylon

Monarchs of Polonnaruwa
M
M
M